Martijn, occasionally written as Martyn, Martain or Martein is Dutch given name. It is a cognate of Martin, and ultimately derived from the Roman Martinus.In Iceland the name is written as Marteinn. The feminine form is Martina.

Martijn
Martijn Bolkestein (born 1972), Dutch politician
Martijn Garritsen (born 1996), Dutch musician
Martijn Krabbé (born 1968), Dutch actor
Martijn Maaskant (born 1983), Dutch racing cyclist
Martijn Meerdink (born 1976), Dutch association football player
Martijn Meeuwis (born 1982), Dutch baseball player
Martijn Monteyne (born 1984), Belgian association football player
Martijn Padding (born 1956), Dutch composer
Martijn Duijm (born 1971), Dutch Security Specialist
Martijn Reuser (born 1975), Dutch association football player
Martijn Spierenburg (born 1975), Dutch keyboardist
Martijn ten Velden, Dutch DJ and music producer
Martijn van Dam (born 1978), Dutch engineer and politician
Martijn van Helvert (born 1978), Dutch politician
Martijn van der Laan (born 1988), Dutch association football player
Martijn van der Linden (born 1979), Dutch illustrator
Martijn van Oostrum (born 1976), Dutch judoka
Martijn Westerholt (born 1979), Dutch keyboardist and songwriter
Martijn Zuijdweg (born 1976), Dutch freestyle swimmer

Martyn
Martyn Deykers, (born 1975) Dutch producer and DJ

Marteinn
 Marteinn Einarsson (†1576), Icelandic bishop of Skálholt
 Marteinn Geirsson (born 1951), retired Icelandic footballer

See also
 Maarten, another Dutch cognate of Martin
 Martin (name)
 Martyn (English given name)

References and notes

Dutch masculine given names